The Wawel Royal Castle National Art Collection is the residence museum and collection housed in the historic Wawel Castle of Kraków. The collection was inaugurated officially in 1930, with its current name introduced in 1994.

Divisions 

 Non-administrative departments
 Department of Archaeology
 Department of Ceramics
 Department of Education
 Department of Exhibitions
 Department of Furniture and Clocks
 Department of Goldsmithing
 Department of Inventories and Catalogues
 Department of Metalwork
 Department of Militaria
 Department of Paintings, Prints and Sculptures
 Department of Photographic Documentation
 Department of Publishing
 Department of Reserves and Lapidarium
 Department of Textiles
 Archives
 Library

 Conservation studios
 Painting, Sculpture and Craftsmanship Conservation Studio
 Furniture Conservation Studio
 Paper Conservation Studio
 Frames Conservation Studio
 Textile Conservation Studio
 Archaeological Conservation Studio

Floor plans

Directors of Wawel Castle 

 Prof. Tadeusz Mańkowski (1945-1951)
 Prof. Jerzy Szablowski (1951-1989)
 Prof. Jan Ostrowski (1989-2020)
 Prof. Andrzej Betlej (2020- )

See also 
Evacuation of Polish National Treasures during World War II

Citations

Sources 
 Statut Zamku Królewskiego na Wawelu – Państwowych Zbiorów Sztuki. Załącznik do zarządzenia Nr 35 Ministra Kultury i Dziedzictwa Narodowego z dnia 14.07.2011 r. [Charter of the Wawel Royal Castle National Art Collection. Attachment to Regulation No. 35 of the Minister of Culture and National Heritage], Dz. Urz. MKiDN z 2011 r. Nr 5, poz. 44 (2011-07-14)
 
 

Museums in Kraków
Museums established in 1945
Art museums and galleries in Poland
Registered museums in Poland